Kristina Raković (born 26 September 1994) is Montenegrin basketball player.

External links
Profile at eurobasket.com

1994 births
Living people
People from Bijelo Polje
Montenegrin women's basketball players
Power forwards (basketball)
Centers (basketball)
ŽKK Šumadija Kragujevac players
Montenegrin expatriate basketball people in Spain
Montenegrin expatriate basketball people in Serbia